FC Artemisa is a Cuban football team playing at the top level. Estadio de Guanajay, which has capacity for 3,000 people, is their home venue.

Current squad

References

Artemisa
Football clubs in Cuba